The 2016–17 Bundesliga was the 54th season of the Bundesliga, Germany's premier football competition. It began on 26 August 2016 and ended on 20 May 2017. Bayern Munich were the defending champions. Fixtures for the 2016–17 season were announced on 29 June 2016.

Bayern Munich won their 26th Bundesliga title with three games to spare, becoming the first team to win 5 consecutive titles. RB Leipzig became the runners-up, only a year after its promotion last season from the 2015–16 2. Bundesliga.

Teams
A total of 18 teams participated in this edition of the Bundesliga. VfB Stuttgart and Hannover 96 were relegated to 2016–17 2. Bundesliga. Former Bundesliga champion Stuttgart were relegated to the second level after 39 years, whereas Hannover 96 finished a 14-years stint in the top level. They were replaced with 2. Bundesliga champion SC Freiburg and 2. Bundesliga runner-up RB Leipzig. Freiburg immediately returned to the Bundesliga, whereas RB Leipzig makes its debut. Finally Eintracht Frankfurt, 16th of Bundesliga faced 1. FC Nürnberg, third of 2. Bundesliga in a Bundesliga play-off. Eintracht won 2–1 on aggregate and remained in the top level.

RB Leipzig was the first team from the former East Germany to play in the Bundesliga since the relegation of Energie Cottbus after the 2008–09 season.

Stadiums and locations

Personnel and kits

Coaching changes

League table

Results

Relegation play-offs

First leg

Second leg

VfL Wolfsburg won 2–0 on aggregate and both clubs therefore remained in their respective tiers for the 2017–18 season.

Statistics

Top scorers

Hat-tricks

4 Player scored four goals

Clean sheets

Number of teams by state

References

External links

Bundesliga seasons
1
Germany